Handheld Games Corp. was an American video game developer based in Mill Creek, Washington. They were primarily known for developing licensed titles for various consoles.

The former director, Thomas L. Fessler, a 25-year veteran of the games industry, left after its closure in 2009 and now works on app development for Costco Wholesale Corporation.

Games developed

References

External links
http://www.tower.com/n_ad_search/search_4_rslt.cfm?div_id=4&title=&keywords=&format=0&label=&artist=Handheld%20Games&ESRB=
https://web.archive.org/web/20041010040748/http://www.handheldgames.com/

Defunct software companies of the United States
Software companies based in Washington (state)
Video game companies of the United States
Companies based in Mill Creek, Washington